A referendum on coup leader Gnassingbé Eyadéma remaining as the president was held in Togo on 9 January 1972. Eyadéma had overthrown the government in 1967 and installed himself as president on 14 April.

Voters were asked the question "Do you want General Eyadéma to continue the functions of president of the republic entrusted to him by the army and the people?" The result was reported to be 99.9% of voters in favour with a 97.8% turnout.

Results

References

1972 referendums
1972 in Togo
1972
January 1972 events in Africa